Boyz n the Hood is a 1991 American coming-of-age crime drama film written and directed by John Singleton in his feature directorial debut. It stars Cuba Gooding Jr., Ice Cube, Nia Long, Morris Chestnut, Tyra Ferrell, Laurence Fishburne, Regina King, and Angela Bassett. Boyz n the Hood follows Tre Styles (Gooding Jr.), who is sent to live with his father Furious Styles (Fishburne) in South Central Los Angeles, surrounded by the neighborhood's booming gang culture. The film's title is a double entendre: a play on the term boyhood and a reference to the 1987 Eazy-E rap song of the same name, written by Ice Cube.

Singleton initially developed the film as a requirement for application to film school in 1986 and sold the script to Columbia Pictures upon graduation in 1990. During writing, he drew inspiration from his own life and from the lives of people he knew and insisted he direct the project. Principal photography began in September 1990 and was filmed on location from October to November 1990. The film is notable for featuring breakout roles for Ice Cube, Gooding Jr., Chestnut, and Long.

Boyz n the Hood was screened in the Un Certain Regard section at the 1991 Cannes Film Festival. It premiered in Los Angeles on July 2, 1991, and was theatrically released in the United States ten days later. The film became a critical and commercial success, grossing $57.5 million in North America and earning nominations for Best Director and Best Original Screenplay at the 64th Academy Awards. Singleton became the youngest person and the first African American to be nominated for Best Director. In 2002, the United States Library of Congress deemed it "culturally, historically, or aesthetically significant" and selected it for preservation in the National Film Registry.

Plot
In 1984, ten-year-old Tre Styles lives with his single mother, Reva Devereaux, in Inglewood, California. After Tre gets into a fight at school, his teacher calls Reva and says that although Tre is intelligent, he is immature and lacks respect. Frightened about Tre's future, Reva sends him to live in the Crenshaw neighborhood of South Central with his father, Furious Styles, from whom she hopes Tre will learn life lessons. Furious is strict and assigns Tre chores, but he is also a caring and attentive father.  In Crenshaw, Tre reunites with his childhood friends Darrin "Doughboy" Baker, Doughboy's half-brother Ricky, and their friend Chris. That night, Tre hears Furious shooting at a burglar. Furious calls the LAPD, and two officers arrive an hour later. The white officer is civil, while the black one treats Furious with contempt. The next day, Tre and Furious return from a fishing trip to see Doughboy and Chris being arrested for stealing. 

Seven years later, a welcome home party is held for Doughboy, now a Crips member, following his release from prison. At the party are Chris, now in a wheelchair from a gunshot wound, and new friends and fellow Crip members Dookie and Monster. Ricky, now a star running back at Crenshaw High School, lives with his mother Brenda, girlfriend Shanice, and their toddler son. Meanwhile, Tre has grown into a responsible teenager who hopes to attend college with his girlfriend, Brandi. Their relationship is troubled over Tre's desire to have sex, while Brandi wants to wait until marriage.

Later, during a street racing gathering, Ricky is provoked by Ferris, a Bloods member. In Ricky's defense, Doughboy brandishes his handgun, leading to an argument between the gangs. After they leave, Tre and Ricky are pulled over by an LAPD patrol; the lead officer, Coffey, is the black officer who responded to the burglary years earlier. Coffey holds his gun at Tre's throat, threatening him. Distraught, Tre goes to Brandi's house, where he has a breakdown. After she comforts him, they have sex.

The next afternoon, Ricky has a fight with Doughboy, with Brenda taking Ricky's side, and berating Doughboy. Afterward, Brenda asks Ricky to run an errand and Tre accompanies him to a nearby drugstore. After they depart, a letter is delivered with Ricky's SAT results. After leaving the store, Ricky and Tre see Ferris and the Bloods driving around and cut through back alleys to avoid them before splitting up. As they walk in separate directions, the Bloods drive close to Ricky and one of them fatally guns him down. Doughboy, who realized Tre and Ricky were in trouble when he saw the car circling the block, is distraught over Ricky's death. Doughboy helps Tre carry Ricky's bloodied corpse home. Brenda and Shanice break into tears, with Brenda and Shanice blaming Doughboy for causing the shooting. Later, Brenda sobs over Ricky's test results. Ricky scored a 710, enough to qualify for the USC scholarship.

Angered, the remaining boys vow vengeance on the Bloods. Furious finds Tre preparing to take his gun but convinces him to abandon his plans for revenge. However, Brandi and Furious catch Tre sneaking out to join Doughboy. Later, as the gang drive around the city, Tre asks to be let out of the car and returns home. Doughboy finds the Bloods at a fast-food restaurant. Monster guns the Bloods down as they flee. Doughboy gets out of his car and shoots Ferris and another  wounded gang member dead, avenging Ricky’s death. Later that evening, after coming home, Furious waits for Tre. The two stare at each other with no words exchanged and walk into their bedrooms for the night.

The next morning, Doughboy visits Tre, understanding Tre's reasons for abandoning the gang. Doughboy knows he will face retaliation for killing Ferris and accepts the consequences of his crime-ridden life. He questions why American media "don't know, don't show, or don't care about what's going on in the hood." He says that he has no brothers after Ricky's death, but Tre embraces him, saying he "still got one brother left." 

The epilogue text reveals that Ricky was buried the next day, Doughboy was murdered two weeks later, and Tre later goes to college with Brandi in Atlanta.

Cast
 Cuba Gooding Jr. as Jason "Tre" Styles III (age 17)
 Desi Arnez Hines II as Tre (age 10)
 Angela Bassett as Reva Devereaux
 Laurence Fishburne as Jason "Furious" Styles Jr.
 Ice Cube as Darrin "Doughboy" Baker (age 17)
 Baha Jackson as Doughboy (age 10)
 Morris Chestnut as Ricky Baker (age 17)
 Donovan McCrary as Ricky (age 10)
 Nia Long as Brandi (age 17)
 Nicole Brown as Brandi (age 10)
 Tyra Ferrell as Brenda Baker
 Redge Green as Chris "Little Chris" (age 17)
 Kenneth A. Brown as Chris (age 10)
 Whitman Mayo as the old man
 John Singleton as the mailman
 Dedrick D. Gobert as "Dooky"
 Baldwin C. Sykes as "Monster"
 Tracey Lewis-Sinclair as Shaniqua
 Alysia Rogers as Shanice
 Regina King as Shalika
 Lexie Bigham as "Mad Dog"
 Raymond Turner as Ferris
 Lloyd Avery II as Knucklehead #2
 Kirk Kinder as Officer Graham 
 Jessie Lawrence Ferguson as Officer Coffey

Production
Singleton wrote the film based on his own life and that of people he knew. When applying for film school, one of the questions on the application form was to describe "three ideas for films". One of the ideas Singleton composed was titled Summer of 84, which later evolved into Boyz n the Hood. During writing, Singleton was influenced by the 1986 film Stand by Me, which inspired both an early scene where four young boys take a trip to see a dead body and the closing fade-out of main character Doughboy.

Upon completion, Singleton was protective of his script, insisting that he be the one to direct the project, later explaining at a retrospective screening of the film "I wasn't going to have somebody from Idaho or Encino direct this movie." He sold the script to Columbia Pictures in 1990, who greenlit the film immediately out of interest in making a film similar to the comedy-drama film Do the Right Thing (1989).

The role of Doughboy was written specially for Ice Cube, whom Singleton met while working as an intern at The Arsenio Hall Show. Singleton also noted the studio was unaware of Ice Cube's standing as a member of rap group N.W.A. Singleton claims Gooding and Chestnut were cast because they were the first ones who showed up to auditions, while Fishburne was cast after Singleton met him on the set of Pee-wee's Playhouse, where Singleton worked as a production assistant and security guard.

Long grew up in the area the film depicts and has said, “It was important as a young actor to me that this feels real because I knew what it was like go home from school and hear gunshots at night.” Bassett referred to the filmmaker as her “little brother” on set. “I'd been in LA for about three years and I was trying, trying, trying to do films,” she said. “We talked, I auditioned and he gave me a shot. I’ve been waiting to work with him ever since.”

The film was shot in sequence, with Singleton later noting that, as the film goes on, the camera work gets better as Singleton was finding his foothold as a director. He has a cameo in the film, appearing as a mailman handing over mail to Brenda as Doughboy and Ricky are having a scuffle in the front yard.

Reception and legacy

Critical response
Review aggregation website Rotten Tomatoes gives the film an approval rating of 96% based on 69 reviews and an average score of 8.40/10. The website's critical consensus reads, "Well-acted and thematically rich, Boyz n the Hood observes urban America with far more depth and compassion than many of the like-minded films its success inspired." At Metacritic, the film received an average score of 76 out of 100 based on 20 reviews, which indicates "generally favorable reviews".

Cultural impact
Boyz n the Hood launched the acting careers of Gooding, Chestnut, and Long, who were relatively unknown before it. It also launched the Hollywood acting career of Ice Cube and was the first significant film roles for both Angela Bassett and Regina King.

Accolades

In 2007, Boyz n the Hood was selected as one of the 50 Films To See in your lifetime by Channel 4.

American Film Institute Lists
 AFI's 100 Years...100 Movies (10th Anniversary Edition) – Nominated

In popular culture
Australian alternative rock band TISM released a live VHS called Boyz n the Hoods in 1992, whose cover artwork is presented as a parody of the film's original VHS box, albeit with a fake disclaimer printed on the cover stating that due to a manufacturing error, the non-existent film was replaced with TISM's concert.

Characters and scenes from Boyz n the Hood are parodied in the 1996 crime comedy parody film, Don't Be a Menace to South Central While Drinking Your Juice in the Hood.

In the 2015 comedy film Get Hard, Kevin Hart's character Darnell is asked to talk about the reason for his fabricated incarceration years earlier. Fumbling for a story, he describes the final scene of Boyz n the Hood, passing it off as his own experience to Will Ferrell's character.

Soundtrack

See also

 List of hood films

References

External links

 
 
 
 
 
 
 Boyz in the Hood essay by Daniel Eagan in America's Film Legacy: The Authoritative Guide to the Landmark Movies in the National Film Registry, A&C Black, 2010 , pages 

1991 films
1991 crime drama films
1991 directorial debut films
1991 romantic drama films
1990s coming-of-age drama films
1990s gang films
1990s hip hop films
1990s teen drama films
American coming-of-age drama films
American crime drama films
American gang films
American romantic drama films
American teen drama films
American teen romance films
African-American films
Bloods
Columbia Pictures films
Coming-of-age romance films
Crips
1990s English-language films
Films about death
Films about families
Films about racism in the United States
American films about revenge
Films directed by John Singleton
Films scored by Stanley Clarke
Films set in 1984
Films set in 1991
Films set in Los Angeles
Films with screenplays by John Singleton
Hood films
United States National Film Registry films
1990s American films